Terrortory is the fifth studio album from the Detroit-based heavy metal band Halloween. It was released in February 2012.

History
Most of the songs on Terrortory were written around the same time as the songs from the group's previous studio album Horror Fire. However, a few tracks are older. The songs "Not One", "Say Your Prayers", and "Images Quite Horrible" were written in 1990–1991, and "Caught In The Webs" was written in 1983 before the band's debut, Don't Metal With Evil. The song titled "Darkside, Inside" was originally recorded for the 2003 compilation Tricks, Treats And Other Tales From The Crypt. The song titled "Where's Michael?" was originally written for Rob Zombie's Halloween movie, but it did not make it on to the soundtrack.

Track listing
 Traipsing Through The Blood  
 At The Gates
 Terrortory
 Images Quite Horrible 
 Her Ghost Comes Out To Play
 Caught In The Webs
 Scare You
 Not One  
 Darkside, Inside
 Re-Inventing Fear
 I Lie Awake
 Hands Around My Throat
 Say Your Prayers   
 Where Is Michael?
 Dead On...
 Into The Afterlife  (instrumental)

Personnel
Brian Thomas – vocals
Donny Allen – guitars
Don Guerrier – guitars
George Neal – bass
Rob Brug – drums

References

Halloween (band) albums
2012 albums